The 1917 Copa Ibarguren was the 5th. edition of this National cup of Argentina. It was played by the champions of both leagues, Primera División and Liga Rosarina de Football crowned during 1917.

Racing (Primera División champion) faced Rosario Central (Liga Rosarina champion), playing their 4th. consecutive final. The match was hosted at Gimnasia y Esgrima Stadium in Palermo, on January 13, 1918. Racing won 3–2 achieving its 4th trophy within 5 years.

Qualified teams 

Note

Match details

References

i
i
1917 in Argentine football
1917 in South American football
Football in Buenos Aires